Hamza Shehata (1910/11-1971/72) was a philosopher, poet and civic leader from the Hejaz in the western part of modern Saudi Arabia. The eccentric Hejazi genius was born in Mecca and raised in Jeddah. He studied at the Al-Falah School (established in 1905), then moved to India where he worked at the Zainal trading house for a number of years. Upon his return, he joined the Jeddah Council of Commerce.

Shehata is regarded as a Saudi pioneer, a leading poet and thinker, and an influential figure in the cultural modernism movement that occurred in the Hejaz in the early 20th century. Along with another Hejazi poet Mohammed Hassan Awwad, he was among the first to compose and publish Arabic poems in modern format, starting in the 1920s.

He is also well known for his writings on ethical issues and social philosophy. In 1940 he gave a famous speech in Mecca addressing complex ethical concerns and advocating social and religious reform. His bold ideas and political activism led to his exile in 1931, along with other Hejazi leaders and youth, in Al-Massmak fort in Riyadh, sent there by King Abdul Aziz. Just after he was pardoned, he left Hejaz for Cairo, opposing the way things were run in his country.

He was influenced by key social and political leaders in the Hejaz such as Qassim Zainal and Mohammed Suroor Sabban. His literary work was influenced by, among others, Khalil Gibran, Iliyya Abu Madi and Mikha'il Na'ima.

Notable works
 Al-Rojollah 'Imad Al-Kholoqu Al-Fadil (speech on ethics)
 Rifat Akkl (work on ethics)
 Himar Hamzah Shihatta (work on ethics, religion and social reform)
 Diwan Hamzah Shihatta (complete poems)
 Ghadat Bulaqu (poetry)
 Eila Ibbnaty Sheiren (romantic literature; letters to his daughter in Jeddah)

Hamza Shehata in film
In 2013, filmmaker Mahmoud Sabbagh created, produced and directed a documentary on Hamza Shahata, titled: "Memories of Old Mecca; Hamza Shahata's Story".

References

People from Jeddah
20th-century Saudi Arabian poets
Saudi Arabian writers
1910s births
1972 deaths
Recipients of Saudi Arabian royal pardons